Myles Laurence Boney (born 1 February 1998) is an English professional footballer who plays as a goalkeeper for South Shields

Career
Boney was born in Blackpool and began his career with his hometown club.

In April 2015 Boney was selected for an England national goalkeeper's training camp.

In July 2015 he went on trial with Manchester City.

He made his debut for Blackpool on 10 November 2015 in the Football League Trophy, appearing as a 77th-minute substitute following an injury to Kyle Letheren. He moved on loan to Nantwich Town in January 2018.

On 14 May 2018, Boney signed a new one-year deal with Blackpool. On 31 December 2018, Boney joined Solihull Moors on a one-month loan deal. After only 12 days, he was recalled.

In July 2019 he moved on loan to South Shields. He made 35 appearances for the club in all competitions.

In June 2020 it was announced that he would leave Blackpool at the end of his contract.

On 21 July 2020 he re-joined South Shields on a permanent transfer.

After making 16 appearances for the club in all competitions, On 20 January 2021 Boney joined National League North side Darlington on loan.

Career statistics

References

External links
Myles Boney profile - South Shields F.C. official website

1998 births
Living people
English footballers
People from Blackpool
Blackpool F.C. players
Nantwich Town F.C. players
Solihull Moors F.C. players
South Shields F.C. (1974) players
Darlington F.C. players
Association football goalkeepers
English Football League players